Fain may refer to:

Fain (surname)
Fain Skinner (born 1985), American racing driver
Fain Lake, a lake in Arizona, United States
Fain, a character in the Wheel of Time series, see List of Wheel of Time characters
 Fain, a 2013 album by British psychedelic rock band Wolf People
Fain-lès-Montbard, a commune in Côte-d'Or, France
Fain-lès-Moutiers, a commune in Burgundy, France

See also
Fane (disambiguation)